7β-Hydroxyepiandrosterone (7β-OH-EPIA), also known as 5α-androstan-3β,7β-diol-17-one, is an endogenous androgen, estrogen, and neurosteroid that is produced from dehydroepiandrosterone and epiandrosterone. It has neuroprotective effects and, along with 7α-hydroxyepiandrosterone, may mediate the neuroprotective effects of DHEA. 7β-OH-EPIA may act as a highly potent antagonist of the G protein-coupled estrogen receptor (GPER) (affinity of <1 nM).

References

5α-Reduced steroid metabolites
Androgens and anabolic steroids
Androstanes
Neuroprotective agents
Neurosteroids